Friends in the Corner is the second extended play (EP) by English singer and songwriter Foxes. It was released on 1 April 2021 through PIAS Recordings. The EP was preceded by numerous singles, including "Love Not Loving You", "Woman", "Friends in the Corner", "Hollywood" and "Kathleen" which were released throughout 2020 and 2021.

Background 
Following the release of her second album, All I Need, Foxes took a four-year hiatus from music. In February 2018, she teased new music stating "Thank you for your patience with this next record... I will be releasing new music this year and I can't wait to share it with you".

Release and promotion 
The EP's lead single, "Love Not Loving You", was released on 20 May 2020. The song was her first release in four years and marked Foxes' first release with her new record label, PIAS, after departing from RCA and Sign of the Times. The second single, "Woman", was released on 29 July 2020. This was followed by "Friends in the Corner" on 2 September 2020 and "Hollywood" on 4 December 2020.

"Kathleen" was released as the fifth single on 17 March 2021, along with a YouTube premiere for its music video. The announcement of the EP's release coincided with the premiere, and the EP was made available for pre-order on 19 March 2021.

Track listing

References 

2021 EPs
Foxes (singer) albums